Harsh Varrdhan Kapoor ( born 9 November 1990) is an Indian actor and film producer. He is the son of actor Anil Kapoor.

Early life
Harsh was born in Mumbai on 9 November 1990, the only son of actor Anil Kapoor and Sunita Kapoor. The youngest of three children, he is the brother of actress Sonam Kapoor and producer Rhea Kapoor. He did his early schooling at Arya Vidya Mandir in Juhu and A levels at Podar International. Kapoor pursued screenwriting at Chapman University in Orange County Southern California. While at Chapman, Harsh trained under Oscar-winning screenwriter David Ward who is known for films like Sting and Sleepless in Seattle.

Harsh has often said in interviews that from a very young age, he was fortunate enough to have been exposed to various genres of cinema from all over the world. This exposure to different forms and aesthetics has been instrumental in shaping his choices and sensibilities in his own film career.

Career
Before his acting debut, Kapoor worked as an assistant director on Anurag Kashyap's 2015 film Bombay Velvet.

Harshvardhan made his acting debut when Rakesh Omprakash Mehra's, the maker of Rang De Basanti and Bhaag Milkha Bhaag, approached him for an art house romantic musical called Mirzya. Written by the Oscar winning Gulzar, Mirzya used poetry and a Greek chorus as narrative guides, a style that was both bold and unconventional.  Having signed the film in 2013, Harsh spent over a year preparing for the film. He learned horse riding and archery and worked on the two distinct characters that the film required him to play. Mirzya premiered at the prestigious London film festival in 2016 to positive reviews in the international press with the New York Times praising it but received mixed reviews back home in India and could not perform very well commercially. While reviewing Meena Iyer of Times of India gave the film a 3/5 rating, praised the performance of leads Harshvardhan and Saiyami, and called the film "A broad, brash Bollywood romance, juggling Punjabi folklore with more contemporary Shakespearean allusions in its two-tiered narrative". The Economic Times gave the film 3.5/5 rating and stated, "Impressive performance by Harshvardhan Kapoor & Saiyami Kher, but a one-time watch."

Harsh’s next film was Vikramaditya Motwane’s vigilante drama Bhavesh Joshi Superhero. Financed by Eros, and later Reliance and Phantom Films, the film released to polarizing reviews in June 2018. Movie aficionados praised the film for its realism, strong performances and technical merits but others took issue with its jarring length and predictable plot points. It was only when the movie released on digital platforms that it started to gain momentum with YouTube and the blogosphere blowing up with rave reviews. Over the months and years that have followed, Bhavesh Joshi has amassed a massive cult following with some referring to it as India’s best superhero film ever and campaigning for a sequel. In spite receiving positive reviews, the film was a box-office bomb grossing just 4.35 crore on a 21 crore budget. Neil Soans of The Times of India praised the central theme of the film and the acting performances with a special mention for Priyanshu Painyuli and gave the film a rating of 3.5 out of 5. Raja Sen of NDTV said that the film has good intentions and is filled with praiseworthy acting performances but the screenplay lacks originality and is not strong enough to make the film an interesting watch. Rajeev Masand of News18 was impressed with the concept of the film, the acting performances and the music by Amit Trivedi but was critical of the poorly written script and gave the film a rating of 2.5 out of 5.

In 2020, he worked with Vikramaditya Motwane again in the Netflix film AK vs AK, in which he played a fictionalized version of himself and shared the screen with his father and sister.  Harsh went on to deliver one of the most memorable cameos of recent times with critics from all corners showering him with massive praise. The risk taken by the team of AK vs AK paid off in a big way when the film went on to become one of the most acclaimed films of 2020. Harsh had reportedly also signed on to play the lead in Sriram Raghavan’s Andhadhun but eventually had to withdraw due to scheduling conflicts.

In 2021, he appeared in one of the episodes of Netflix show Ray. While reviewing Hindustan Times's Rohan Naahar wrote "Manoj Bajpayee, Harsh Varrdhan Kapoor, Ali Fazal and Radhika Madan lead a handful of excellent performers in Netflix's irreverent but inconsistent anthology, based on Satyajit Ray's short stories."

In 2022, he acted in and co-produced a film titled Thar which was released on Netflix on 6 May 2022. The film also starred his father, Fatima Sana Shaikh and Satish Kaushik in key roles. It was directed and co-written by Raj Singh Chaudhary. The dialogues were written by Anurag Kashyap. It received mixed to positive reviews from critics, who praised the direction, cinematography, performances, dialogues, background score, and its homages to the Western genre, though some criticized its predictable story, screenplay, and editing. Taran Adarsh of Bollywood Hungama gave the film a rating of 3.5/5 stars and wrote "Thar is a surprise of the season and worth watching for its plot, direction, music score and the never before seen locales of Rajasthan". Peter Bradshaw of The Guardian gave the film a rating of 3/5 stars and wrote "There are hints of Sergio Leone and Cormac McCarthy in this Rajasthan-set mystery starring the actor and his son". Bharathi Pradhan of Lehren gave the film a rating of 3/5 stars and stated "Cruel & Compelling". Renuka Vyavahare of The Times Of India gave the film a rating of 3/5 stars and wrote "Anil Kapoor's film choices are only getting better and bolder with age. Be it Thar or AK vs AK, he's showing the millennials and OTT clan what a certified movie star is made of". Reubyn Coutinho of Netflix Junkie wrote "Shots of the sprawling desert landscape give one that classic western feel that can transport them back in time to the classic westerns or even the spaghetti westerns." Prateek Sur of Outlook India gave the film a rating of 3/5 stars and wrote "While Chaudhary has made a great attempt at bringing forth a dark neo-noir thriller, but in his haste to keep it under two hours, he has just squandered a great plot at hand".He is currently working on the biopic of the olympic gold medalist Abhinav Bindra, in which he will act and is the producer of it.

Artistry 
Kapoor followed up the critical acclaim for his appearance in AK vs AK with acclaimed filmmaker Vasan Bala’s adaptation of Satyajit Ray’s short story Spotlight in the Netflix anthology series Ray. Ray released to largely positive reviews with Bala’s and Abhishek Chaubey’s films receiving the most praise. He received some stellar reviews from top critics. Ray later went on to be nominated for Best Film at the Filmfare OTT awards.

With Bhavesh Joshi, AK vs AK and Ray, Harsh soon garnered a reputation for making good film choices. His next film Thar was a collaboration with his father Anil Kapoor. The movie was co-written by Anurag Kashyap, directed by an debutant actor-turned-director Raj Singh Chaudhary and led by Harsh, Thar was India’s first western noir action thriller. Because of the risky format and genre of the movie, he was fighting an uphill battle to get the film financed until Netflix greenlit the film. In order to play a quiet character with many shades of gray, he worked hard on his physicality so that body language could speak louder than words. That releas

on Netflix in 2022 to rave reviews both domestically and internationally. An Ormax media survey revealed Thar to be one of the most liked and watched OTT originals of 2022. Notably, Thar marked the debut of Harsh as producer under the AKFC banner.

During the pandemic, Harsh worked closely with acting coaches Jeff Goldberg and Suraj Vyas to hone his craft. He has, on many occasions, spoken candidly about how implicitly he trusts his mentors to guide him on new projects.

Filmography

Films

Television

Awards and nominations

References

External links
 

1990 births
Living people
Indian male film actors
Male actors from Mumbai
Male actors in Hindi cinema
Punjabi people
Harshvardhan
Screen Awards winners